The 1941 Northern Illinois State Huskies football team represented Northern Illinois State Teachers College—now known as Northern Illinois University—as a member of the Illinois Intercollegiate Athletic Conference (IIAC) during the 1941 college football season. Led by 13th-year head coach Chick Evans, the Huskies compiled an overall record of 7–1–1 with a mark of 3–1 in conference play, sharing the IIAC title with Illinois State Normal. The team played home games at the 5,500-seat Glidden Field, located on the east end of campus, in DeKalb, Illinois.

Schedule

References

Northern Illinois State
Northern Illinois Huskies football seasons
Interstate Intercollegiate Athletic Conference football champion seasons
Northern Illinois State football